Albert Harrison  may refer to:

 Albert Harrison (footballer, born 1904), English footballer who played for Wigan Borough, Leicester City and Nottingham Forest
 Albert Harrison (footballer, born 1909), English footballer who played for Port Vale
 Albert Harrison (psychologist), American psychologist specializing in societal implications of extraterrestrial life
 Albert Galliton Harrison (1800–1839), U.S. Representative from Missouri